Giacomo D'Apollonio (born 25 April 1951 in Isernia) is an Italian politician.

He is a member of the right-wing party Brothers of Italy. He was elected Mayor of Isernia on 19 June 2016 and took office on 24 June, holding the office until 19 October 2021.

He is brigadier general on leave of the Guardia di Finanza.

See also
2016 Italian local elections
List of mayors of Isernia

References

External links
 

1951 births
Living people
Mayors of Isernia
Brothers of Italy politicians